Trinity College (occasionally referred to as The University of Trinity College)  is a college federated with the University of Toronto, founded in 1851 by Bishop John Strachan. Strachan originally intended Trinity as a university of strong Anglican alignment, after the University of Toronto severed its ties with the Church of England. After five decades as an independent institution, Trinity joined the university in 1904 as a member of its collegiate federation.

Today, Trinity College consists of a secular undergraduate section and a postgraduate divinity school which is part of the Toronto School of Theology. Through its diploma granting authority in the field of divinity, Trinity maintains legal university status. Trinity hosts three of the University of Toronto Faculty of Arts and Sciences' undergraduate programs: international relations; ethics, society and law; and immunology.

More than half of Trinity students graduate from the University of Toronto with distinction or high distinction. The college has produced an unusually high number of Rhodes Scholars for an institution of its size, being 43 as of 2020. Among the college's more notable collections are a seventeenth-century Flemish tapestry, two first-edition theses by Martin Luther, numerous original, signed works by Winston Churchill, a 1491 edition of Dante's Divine Comedy censored by the Spanish Inquisition, and Bishop Strachan's silver epergne.

Among the University of Toronto Colleges, Trinity is notable for being the smallest by population, and for its trappings of Oxbridge heritage; the college hosts weekly formal dinners, maintains the tradition of academic gowns, manages its student government through direct democracy, and hosts a litany of clubs and societies.

History

Founding

The Reverend John Strachan (1778-1867) was an Anglican priest, Archdeacon of York, and staunch supporter of Upper Canada's conservative Family Compact. Strachan was interested in education, and as early as 1818 petitioned the colonial House of Assembly for the formation of a theological university. In 1826, Lieutenant Governor Sir Peregrine Maitland commissioned Strachan to visit England and obtain a royal charter for a provincial university. Strachan was successful, and returned in 1827 with a charter from King George IV to establish King's College in Upper Canada. King's College was effectively controlled by the Church of England and members of the elite Family Compact, and at first reflected Strachan's ambition for an institution of conservative, High Anglican character. Strachan objected to proposals for the provincial university to be without a religious affiliation, dubbing such a suggestion "atheistical, and so monstrous in its consequences that, if successfully carried out, it would destroy all that is pure and holy in morals and religion, and would lead to greater corruption than anything adopted during the madness of the French Revolution."

In 1849, over strong opposition from Strachan, Robert Baldwin's Reformist government took control of the college and secularized it to become the University of Toronto. Incensed by this decision, Strachan immediately began raising funds for the creation of a new university. Strachan canvassed Great Britain and Upper Canada for donations, and although he fell short of his goal of £30,000, he received significant commitments from the Society for the Propagation of the Gospel, the Duke of Wellington, William Gladstone, and Oxford University. Despite Strachan's public anti-Americanism, the project for a new Anglican university attracted substantial donations from a fundraising campaign in the United States by The Reverend William McMurray.

On April 30, 1851, now-Bishop Strachan led a parade of clergy, schoolboys, and prospective faculty from the Church of St George the Martyr to the site of the new Trinity College. There, Strachan delivered a speech repeating his condemnation of the "destruction of King's College as a Christian institution," and promised that Trinity would fulfil the role of a church university. The Provincial Parliament incorporated Trinity College as an independent university on August 2, 1851. The following year, Strachan - now in his 70s - obtained a Royal Charter for Trinity from Queen Victoria. The college opened to students on January 15, 1852. Most of the first class of students and faculty came from the Diocesan Theological Institute, an Anglican seminar in Cobourg also founded by Strachan in 1842, which dissolved itself in favour of Trinity. 

Unlike the University of Toronto, all of Trinity's students and faculty were required to be members of the Anglican Church. This was actually a stronger condition than the original King's College, which only held a religious test for faculty members and students of divinity. Applicants to Trinity's Faculty of Arts were required to pass exams in biblical history, Latin, Greek, arithmetic, algebra, and Euclid. Applicants for the divinity school were required to have a bachelor's degree in arts, and to pass oral exams from the Provost in the New Testament, church catechism, Latin, and Greek.

At the opening of the College, Bishop Strachan used the metaphor of the family to describe Trinity. Per Strachan, Trinity would "constitute a great Christian household, the domestic home of all who resort to it for instruction, framing them in the Christian graces, and in all sound learning, and sanctifying their knowledge, abilities and attainments to the service of God and the welfare of their fellow-men." The usage of the family metaphor was common at the time, and reflected a common view in Upper Canada that schools were extensions of the family model.

Early years
Designed by Kivas Tully, the original Trinity College building was constructed in 1851 on Queen's Street West, in what was then an undeveloped western end outside the Toronto city bounds. The building featured Gothic Revival design, and was inspired by St. Aidan's Theological College, Birkenhead.

Discipline in the early years was strict. All students were subject to a rigid curfew, and daily chapel attendance was mandatory. If a student wished to leave college grounds, they were required to wear a cap and gown. The college was deliberately built away from the temptations of the city proper. This was all part of Strachan's plan to counteract the University of Toronto's secularism through modelling his vision of conservative Anglican education. Strachan was supported in these efforts by George Whitaker, a clergyman from Cambridge University who served as Trinity's divinity professor and first Provost. Strachan's hatred of the secular university was so great that Trinity's student athletes were forbidden to compete against students from the University of Toronto. It is not well known what the general student body thought of these rules, although there are records of students having cached their formal garb in the College ravine and clandestinely visiting town in informal clothes. Despite the rigid rules and church culture, beer consumption formed an important element of student life, and students purchased over 100 gallons of ale a year from a nearby brewery.

Bishop Benjamin Cronyn of Huron led an attack on the teaching of Trinity College in the early 1860s. Cronyn was an evangelical low church Anglican, who accused Provost Whitaker of spreading "dangerous" Romish doctrines. The College Corporation struck an investigatory committee to investigate Cronyn's claims. After the committee published its findings, Provost Whitaker received votes of confidence from the Corporation, the Synod of Toronto, the Synod of Ontario, and the House of Bishops. Bishop Cronyn responded by resigning from the Corporation, withdrawing all connections between the Diocese of Huron and Trinity College, and founding Huron College (today affiliated with Western University). In 1877, Evangelical Anglicans affiliated with St. James Cathedral founded Wycliffe College as a low-church alternative to Trinity within Toronto.

Bishop Strachan died on November 1, 1867 (All Saints' Day). Provost Whitaker committed to maintaining Strachan's vision for the university, and continued to run the institution in strict conformity with conservative church principles. While Whitaker slowly permitted new courses to be offered, Trinity's core subjects remained theology, classics, and mathematics. Despite the urges of the College Council and some students, Whitaker steadfastly rejected federation with the University of Toronto. To Whitaker, the benefits of joining the larger, secular University were outweighed by the "priceless benefits of such an education as can be given only on Christian principles, and under the hallowed shelter of the Church of Christ."

In 1879, Provost Whitaker lost a contentious election to become Bishop of Toronto. This was his third failure seeking the position, and after the loss he resolved to return to his home in England. Whitaker left in 1881, and in his place the College Council appointed the Reverend Charles Body, another clergyman from Cambridge. Body was thirty at the time of his appointment, and significantly reformed the curriculum and policies of Trinity College. Under Provost Body, religious entry-requirements were abolished for non-divinity students, and the first female students were admitted to study. The requirement to wear a cap and gown while leaving College grounds was dropped, although chapel attendance remained mandatory for both divinity and arts students. Body's reforms succeeded in attracting new students, and within a decade enrollment more than doubled.

The original College building suffered from architectural defects. The building was cold in winter, and fireplaces filled the residence rooms with smoke. Until 1888, the College used coal for heating, which generated noxious fumes. Over time, additional wings were added to the college, such as a convocation hall added in 1877 in memory of John Strachan. A designated chapel was built in 1883 - previously, chapel had been held in a room originally intended for the college's library. Enrolment grew substantially under Provosts Body and Welch, such that in 1894 the College erected an east wing devoted entirely to student residences. 

Under Provost Body and his successor Edward Welch, Trinity College gradually expanded its teaching beyond arts and divinity. By the end of the 19th century Trinity offered degrees in a variety of disciplines, including medicine, law, music, pharmacy and dentistry. The connections between the professional faculties and the College proper were however somewhat tenuous, as students generally took classes elsewhere in Toronto, and only came to the Queen Street campus to write exams and accept degrees. Trinity was founded with a medical school run by six Toronto doctors, and the first lecture ever given at Trinity was on "medical jurisprudence". However, the medical faculty dissolved itself in 1856 in protest of the religious entry requirements. Trinity Medical School re-founded itself in 1871, and taught students in a separate building in Toronto's east end. The school (re-named Trinity Medical College in 1888) existed as an independent legal body in voluntary association with Trinity College. Trinity's Faculty of Music started offering degrees in the 1880s, and offered examinations for degrees in London, England and New York City, as well as Toronto.

In 1884, Helen Gregory enrolled as the first female student at Trinity College. Gregory graduated with three degrees, and later became a judge in the Vancouver Juvenile Court. St. Hilda's College was created in 1888 as Trinity's women's residence. For the first six years of its existence, female students lived and took all their classes in St. Hilda's. Under Provost Welch, co-education came to Trinity, and the two teaching staffs and sets of courses merged into one.

Federation
Federation with the University of Toronto was first suggested in 1868, when a financial crisis compelled the College Council to consider uniting with the University to stave off bankruptcy. Provost Body ultimately eschewed federation, favouring significant reforms to encourage applications. Body's reforms were successful, and the College entered a strong financial position across his thirteen-year term. Body retired as Provost in 1894, and his successor Reverend Edward Welch arrived at the beginning of an economic depression. Under Provost Welch, enrollment declined steeply, and by the turn of the century Trinity had returned to financial crisis.

Provost Thomas C. S. Macklem succeeded Welch in 1900, and entered office in favour of federation with the University of Toronto. In a newspaper interview, Reverend Macklem declared that "the time has come when neither the University of Toronto nor Trinity University can afford to stand aloof from one another any longer without sacrificing a great national ideal." Macklem was Trinity's first Canadian-born Provost, and proved an ardent reformer, who quickly banned beer and hazing over the strong opposition of the student body. In 1901, the Provincial Legislature amended the University of Toronto Act to facilitate a possible federation with Trinity. Trinity celebrated its fiftieth anniversary in 1902, still an independent university, but undergoing negotiations with the University of Toronto on federation. To mark the occasion, Trinity conferred honorary degrees to Premier George William Ross, and renowned physician William Osler. The next year, after what Macklem described as a "long-drawn and bitter" series of debates, the College Corporation voted 121 to 73 in favour of federation with the University of Toronto. Opponents of federation sought a judicial injunction against the agreement, but were unsuccessful. The University of Toronto made a concession to allow Trinity to grant its own degrees in theology, which required the university to remove the restriction from its governing charter.

On October 1, 1904, Trinity became a member college of the University of Toronto and relinquished to the university its authority to grant degrees in subjects other than theology. At first, Trinity students were required to commute from the Queen Street residence to main University campus for classes - a distance of some three and a half kilometres. While Trinity had been intentionally built in a quiet environment away from the bustle of Toronto, the city had expanded, and the college was now located in a seedy outskirt. Trinity resolved to relocate closer to the main University campus, and so abandoned plans for a significant expansion at its Queen Street site. The college acquired its present property near Queen's Park at the university grounds in 1913, but construction of the new college buildings, modeled after the original buildings by Kivas Tully, was not completed until 1925 due to World War I. Five hundred and forty-three Trinity students, staff, and alumni fought in the War, of whom fifty-six died and eighty-six were wounded.

Trinity College's original campus became Trinity Bellwoods Park. The original building was torn down in the 1950s. Of the original campus, only the St. Hilda's women's residence and the entrance gates - constructed in 1904 - remain standing.

On Hoskin Avenue
When Trinity College moved to its present site on Hoskin Avenue in 1925, there was no space for student residences. Not only had the financial pressure of the War delayed construction of the building, it also necessitated a significant scaling back of the design. While the College originally planned for a campus with two quadrangles, a chapel, and a convocation hall, finances only permitted the construction of the south wing by 1925. The building had no residence space, and so the College rented separate buildings on St. George Street for the male and female students. An increasingly large proportion of students chose not to stay on College residence, and the student culture began slowly to be influenced by the larger University.

To counteract the perceived diluting influence of the University of Toronto on Trinity culture, concerned students insisted on wearing College gowns and blazers around campus to classes. In 1949, some students proposed a ban on freshmen joining fraternities, but this was defeated on grounds of impeding on individualism. Trinity engaged in rivalries with nearby Colleges, starting with a series of violent raids from University College in the 1920s. Across the 1950s, Trinity entered into a fierce, yet good-natured rivalry with its immediate neighbour (and competing Anglican divinity school) Wycliffe College. This rivalry included reciprocal raids between the colleges, thefts of college artifacts, and one instance in November 1953 when Wycliffe students filled up Trinity's entryway with bricks from the under-construction chapel.

In 1937, construction began on the new St. Hilda's building, located on the east side of Devonshire Place, a short walk from the main Trinity building. Construction was swift, and female students moved in the next year. St. Hilda's Cartwright Hall became the primary stage for dramatics at Trinity for the subsequent four decades. In 1941, the College added an east wing, allowing male students to move out of the temporary accommodations on St. George and onto the College grounds. The same year, the College added a west wing, complete with the Strachan Dining Hall and the Junior Common Room. This substantial expansion was funded by donations from Gerald Larkin of the Salada Tea Company. After the War, Larkin also funded the construction of the Trinity College chapel in 1953. Previously, the college had used Seeley Hall over the front entrance - originally intended as the library - as the chapel.

One thousand and eighteen Trinity students, staff, and alumni served in the Second World War. Sixty-six were killed, and thirty-seven wounded. Two were made Commanders of the Order of the British Empire, two Officers of the Order of Orange-Nassau, and two granted the Croix de Guerre. In 1940, one hundred and sixty pupils and fifteen teachers from St. Hilda's School for Girls at Whitby in England were sent to Trinity to escape the German wartime bombings, where they were housed at St. Hilda's College.

In 1961, Trinity College completed a new multi-purpose building to its north-west, named after benefactor Gerald Larkin. The Trinity College quadrangle was completed in 1963, when a completed north wing enclosed the land. In 1979, a theater was added to the Larkin Building, named after Provost George Ignatieff, which quickly replaced Cartwright Hall as the primary forum for student drama.

In January 1966, Trinity College hosted the "Trinity College Conference on the Canadian Indian." The Conference included presentations from on and off-reserve indigenous persons, and is believed to be Canada's first student-organized forum on indigenous issues.

George Ignatieff - Canada's former Ambassador to Yugoslavia, NATO, and the United Nations - became Provost in 1972; he was Trinity's first Provost without a theological background. Under Ignatieff, the College integrated its academic programming with the wider University of Toronto to an unprecedented degree. When Ignatieff came to office, the college was deeply in debt. While enrollment remained high, the college was suffering from the policies of the Provincial Government which denied public funds to religious institutions. Due to Trinity's divinity school, it was therefore ineligible for government assistance. As Provost, Ignatieff relieved much of Trinity's faculty, and in 1974 he signed a memorandum of understanding with the University's Faculty of Arts and Science, ending much of Trinity's independent academics. Where previously Trinity students had taken many of their courses in College, thenceforth most courses were taken with students from other colleges under general University departments. Similarly, the Faculty of Divinity joined the Toronto School of Theology in 1978, granting its students access to courses at all the university's theological colleges. One exception to this trend of academic integration was the international relations program, founded at the college in 1976.

Recent years
Trinity College suffered from a spate of negative media stories across the 1990s. In 1991 students began campaigning against Episkopon, a long-standing Trinity student society. Episkopon was founded in 1858 with the objective of providing "gentle chastisement" to errant members of College. By the 1980s, some students began accusing the society of singling out students for racist, sexist, and homophobic attacks. This campaign attracted considerable press, and a statement of support from Marion Boyd, Ontario's Minister for the Status of Women. In fall 1991, an outspoken student critic of Episkopon was doused in a bucket of urine and feces in what was reported as an act of retribution. In 1992, the College Council voted to dissociate Trinity from Episkopon, denying it student funds, official status, and the use of College property.

In 1996, Trinity's Dean of Divinity David Holeton resigned his position after admitting to multiple claims of sexual abuse. Three years later, newspapers reported that Episkopon had returned to holding events, now simply off Trinity grounds.

The turn of the century brought substantial changes to Trinity College. In 2005, Provost Margaret MacMillan - famed historian and herself a Trinity graduate - ended the practice of gender-segregated residences. Whereas previously all women lived in St. Hilda's College and all men in the main Trinity building, under MacMillan co-education came to both buildings, with individual floors being designated single-sex.

Buildings and environs

Trinity College is today located on Hoskin Avenue within the University of Toronto, directly north of Wycliffe College. The primary College grounds are bounded to the North by Varsity Stadium, and to the west by Devonshire House (owned by Trinity College but mostly leased to the Munk School of Global Affairs and Public Policy). Directly to its east, the College overlooks Philosopher's Walk, with the University of Toronto Faculty of Law on the opposite side of the ravine.

Trinity proper

South wing
The front wing of the main building (often referred to as "Trinity Proper") was completed in 1925 by architectural firm Darling and Pearson, among whose other projects include the university's Convocation Hall and Varsity Arena. The architects were required to faithfully preserve the familiar characteristics of the original Trinity College building in the design of the front wing, which is hence of predominantly Jacobethan architectural construction. This is particularly apparent in the characteristic roofline and stone towers of the building, while Tudor Revival styles are employed in the construction of the Angel's Roost tower in the college's west wing. Prominent faces are carved into the doorposts at the entrance to the college, the entrance to Strachan Hall, as well as the gate under the east wing's Henderson Tower. The door from the entrance hall into the Trinity quadrangle is also carved with the signs of the zodiac, while figures of scholars adorn the hallway.

By 1941, immediately prior to the imposition of wartime restrictions on building materials, Trinity College had undertaken the construction of the eastern and western wings under Toronto architectural firm George & Moorhouse. The western wing provides an academic wing containing many of the college's public rooms and services, including Strachan Hall, while the eastern wing comprises expanded residence space for the burgeoning college.

Dining hall
The largest component of the western wing, as well as the central dining hall and social space for students residing at Trinity College, Strachan Hall was built in elaborate wood and stone with the intention of matching the aesthetics of the existing college. It is replete with decorations intended to extol the history and values of the college, with heraldric artist A. Scott Carter commissioned to execute paintings and carvings of the coats of arms belonging to founder John Strachan, Queen Victoria, St Hilda's College, the Trinity Medical College, Provost Cosgrave, and Gerald Larkin. Adorning the walls of the Strachan Hall are portraits of the College Provosts, the founder John Strachan, and Sir John Beverley Robinson - Chief Justice of Upper Canada and the college's first chancellor. The largest portraits, which hang from the north wall, are of Bishop Strachan and George Whitaker, the college's first provost from 1852 to 1880. Hanging on the front wall prominently behind the High Table is a large medieval tapestry provenant of Gerald Larkin's enthusiastic patronage, believed to have been woven in Flanders in the sixteenth century to depict the coming of the Queen of Sheba to the court of King Solomon.

Junior Common Room
Situated in the western wing not far from Strachan Hall, the Junior Common Room (JCR) is used extensively by Trinity College's student organisations as a social and event space. It most prominently houses the Trinity College Literary Institute, whose coat of arms adorns the mantle. A portrait of C. Allan Ashley, professor of Commerce at the University of Toronto, and a long-time resident of Trinity College, hangs to the left of the door.

Chapel

The Trinity College Chapel was built with funds donated by Gerald Larkin, head of the Salada Tea Company from 1922 to 1957. It was designed in the modified perpendicular Gothic style by renowned English architect Giles Gilbert Scott, who was also responsible for the Liverpool Cathedral and the ubiquitous red telephone boxes seen throughout Britain. Using only stone, brick, and cement, Italian stonemasons employed ancient building methods; the only steel in the construction is in the hidden girders supporting the slate roof, with the exterior walls being sandstone. The Chapel contains several architectural sculptures, including a tympanum by Emmanuel Hahn as well as a carved lintel and tympanum by Jacobine Jones, who also carved the wooden angels on the baptistry. The Lady Chapel's altar was preserved from the original Queen Street location chapel, while the matching sedilia was donated by Robertson Davies’ widow in his memory. 
In the chapel a memorial tablet in Indiana limestone designed by Allan George, with lettering and medallions by A. Scott Carter, is dedicated to the members of Trinity College who gave their lives in the First and Second World Wars. A number of bronze memorial plaques also honour alumni who died during the First World War. On the wall outside the entrance to the chapel, a memorial Triptych illuminated manuscript in three frames is an Honour Roll erected by Trinity College in 1942 dedicated to the approximately 1000 men and women of Trinity College who died while serving their country; Canadian artist Jack McNie completed the lettering by hand.

Quadrangle

The college's northern wing was completed by architects Somerville, McMurrich and Oxley in 1963, thereby completely enclosing the college quadrangle.
The Trinity quadrangle has long been a focal point of student life at the college. The site is home to Shakespeare in the Quad, an annual tradition dated to 1949 famed for its of hosting of open-air Shakespeare performances and artistic exhibits. The quadrangle design features footpaths and patterns based on the Greek letter Chi, representing Christ, writ large and intricate flagstones. It was outfitted with a sundial until the quadrangle's renovation in the summer of 2007.

St. Hilda's College

St. Hilda's College, the Trinity College's second residential building and historically the college's female counterpart, was constructed in 1938. Prior to its completion, the women of college resided in three converted homes on St. George Street. Architects George and Moorhouse had built St. Hilda's College in the Georgian style popular at the time at the time, paying particular emphasis to the provision of domestic facilities and spaces to provide a "home-like influence" for young women then expected to adopt traditionally feminine roles and virtues. Originally envisioned as a complementary but separate institution, St. Hilda's only briefly had its own classes, but it retained a separate administrative and social existence until the 21st century. In 2004 St. Hilda's was converted into a mixed residential space inclusive of all students of the college. North and south wings were added later to the building, and in 2010 the College undertook the installation of a green roof.

Library

Trinity's John W. Graham Library traces its origins to 1828, when John Strachan secured a collection of some four hundred books from the Society for Promoting Christian Knowledge to stock the library of the fledgling King's College. When Trinity moved to its present-day location on Hoskin Avenue, the library was initially housed in the basement of the main building. In 2000, the library moved into the east wing of the Devonshire House, a heritage building purpose-renovated for the library, alongside the Munk School of Global Affairs and Public Policy. Also in 2000, Wycliffe College's theological collection merged with the Trinity library, which was renamed after Toronto lawyer and Anglican churchman John W. Graham (also father of Canadian entrepreneur Ted Rogers).

Trinity's library contains some 200,000 volumes, computing resources, and approximately 200 study spaces. The Library primarily serves Trinity's undergraduate students in the Faculty of Arts and Science and the graduate Divinity students and faculty of Trinity and Wycliffe Colleges, as well as the Munk School and Anglican Church communities. Subject strengths reflect Trinity's academic programs and interests: international relations, ethics, English literature, philosophy, theology, Anglican church history, and biblical studies. All Trinity students also have access to the other libraries of the University of Toronto Libraries system.

The Trinity College Friends of the Library promotes the expansion and well-being of the Graham Library. Each year, the Friends put on a book sale in Trinity's Seeley Hall. The book sale attracts visitors from across the continent, and is considered one of Toronto's best. The book sale routinely raises over $100,000 for the Library.

Gerald Larkin Building

The Gerald Larkin Building opened in 1962, while the George Ignatieff Theatre, named for then-provost George Ignatieff, was added to the northwest corner of the Larkin Building in 1979. The Larkin Building is home to the university's Center for Ethics, as well as several classrooms and offices. The ground floor is dominated by "The Buttery," a cafe and student lounge space. In the basement, there is an abandoned, yet perfectly preserved language lab from the 1960s.

Gerald Larkin was President of the Salada Tea Company, and one of Trinity's most generous benefactors. The college's dining hall and chapel were made possible through his donations. Larkin bequeathed Trinity almost $4 million in his will, which the college used to construct the building bearing his name.

Academics
Trinity consists of an undergraduate division that is part of the University of Toronto Faculty of Arts and Science, and a postgraduate Faculty of Divinity that is part of the Toronto School of Theology. Undergraduate students are admitted to Trinity in line with a common framework established by the University of Toronto, which sets the general principles and procedures for admission observed by its colleges. Applicants to Trinity are required to place the college first when ranking their preferences in colleges, and must complete a supplemental application. The college aims to have the fewest undergraduate students among the university's colleges, and limits first-year enrollment limited to about 450 students. In 2018, Trinity's first-year class had an entrance average of 94.6 per cent. In 2020, 63.7% of Bachelor of Science (BSc) graduates and 61.7% of Bachelor of Arts (BA) graduates from Trinity College achieved high distinction (defined by the University of Toronto as a cumulative GPA >3.5) compared to 33.7% and 28.5% (respectively) of total University of Toronto graduates.

Unique programs

Trinity College offers undergraduate programs in immunology, international relations, and ethics, society, and law. The college also hosts first year seminar courses within the "Margaret MacMillan Trinity One Program", named after former Trinity Provost Margaret MacMillan. Admission to the Trinity One program is open to all students at the University of Toronto, but requires a supplemental application.  There are six Trinity One streams, each capped at 20-25 students: Policy, Philosophy & Economics; Ethics, Society, & Law; International Relations; Biomedical Health; Environmental Sustainability; and Medicine & Global Health.

Trinity's undergraduate programs benefits from the presence of the Munk School of Global Affairs and Public Policy, which is housed in Devonshire House on college grounds. Many Trinity faculty members have offices in the Munk School. The Munk School also houses specialized research centers, such as the Asian Institute and the Centre for European, Russian, and Eurasian Studies. The Munk School and its associated institutes host frequent lectures, panels, and events which are open to the Trinity community.

Faculty of Divinity

Beginning in 1837, representatives of the United Church of England and Ireland in Upper Canada met with the Society for Propagation of the Gospel to solicit support for fellowships to enable the education of local clergy. With a guarantee of support, in 1841 Bishop Strachan requested his chaplains, Henry James Grasett and Henry Scadding of St. James' Cathedral, and Alexander Neil Bethune, then Rector of Cobourg, to prepare a plan for a systematic course in theology for those to be admitted to Holy Orders. On January 10, 1842 the first lecture was given at the Diocesan Theological Institute in Cobourg. In 1852, teaching was transferred to Toronto in the new Faculty of Divinity at Trinity College. Trinity College absorbed the Diocesan Theological Institute in Cobourg in 1852.

The Anglican seminary remains active in college life, with approximately a dozen worship services held weekly in the chapel. In recent years, the Orthodox School of Theology has also begun using the chapel for weekly services.

The approximately 100 graduate students enrolled in Trinity's Faculty of Divinity may take courses at other colleges at the Toronto School of Theology. At the basic degree level, Trinity offers several Master of Divinity programs - a basic program, a "collaborative learning" model with self-directed study components, and an honours programme, which includes a thesis. For students not seeking Holy Orders, a Master of Theological Studies is offered, as well as a Certificate in Theological Studies. At the advanced degree level, students may pursue the Master of Arts in Theology, the Master of Theology, the Doctor of Theology and the Doctor of Ministry. Applicants to the Ph.D must hold an M.Div. Students can also enroll jointly in the M.Div. and MA.

In 2006, the Faculty of Divinity began offering an Orthodox and Eastern Christian Studies program. In 2015, this program developed into the Orthodox School of Theology, which offers courses on Eastern Orthodoxy within the Masters of Divinity program.

The Trinity College Faculty of Divinity is accredited by the Association of Theological Schools, and publishes a statement of educational effectiveness. Trinity College is the only college or university in Canada accredited to offer Orthodox theological education.

The Faculty of Divinity's Arms and Badge are registered with the Canadian Heraldic Authority.

Student life

Trinity College enjoys a rich student life, with multiple college events held on a weekly basis. Trinity students maintain a diverse range of clubs and societies, and celebrate numerous traditions. The college hosts two black tie balls annually, and continue to celebrate British holidays including Guy Fawkes and Robbie Burns Days.

Literary Institute
The Trinity College Literary Institute (colloquially, "the Lit") is a satirical debating society that holds weekly meetings. The Lit is a successor body to the Diocesan Theological Institute's Debating Society, and thus technically pre-dates Trinity College itself. The Lit claims to be the oldest debating society in Canada but this is contested by the Queen's Debating Union. In its early decades, the Lit debated issues of serious important to College life, such as compulsory chapel attendance and Sunday street cars. The tone of the debates shifted starting around the end of World War I; today, a typical meeting of the Lit usually includes satirical debates on a humorous topic, updates on college news, and satirical poetry from the Poet Laureate. While the meetings are typically crass student affairs, sitting faculty, distinguished alumni and even Provosts have been known to attend and debate on occasion. Beyond weekly meetings, the Lit organizes other events, historically including the annual Guy Fawkes bonfire, Oktoberfest, Chess in the Quad, Robbie Burns and "Bubbly" - a champagne themed formal ball. The Institute's executive is modeled after Canadian parliament, and consists of a Prime Minister, Speaker, Opposition Leader, and Deputy Speaker. Lists of former Speakers and Prime Ministers going back over a century are prominently displayed in the east hall between the chapel and Strachan Hall.

Balls

Formal dances are held twice annually at Trinity. The Saints Ball is held annually in the fall semester around November at St. Hilda's College, and the Converszione ("conversat") ball is held at Trinity College in the winter semester. Traditionally, the Saint's Ball was hosted by Women of College in their residence, while Conversat was hosted by Men of College in theirs. In recent years, the growing size of the student body has necessitated moving the balls to off-campus venues.  Conversat was historically organized by a committee of the Literary Institute. The first recorded Conversat occurred in 1869, but it was not until 1883 that the event became associated with dancing. Conversat has been held annually since 1869, and has become a key part of social life at Trinity. The ball used to be a central component of Toronto social life, and attracted dignitaries from across the province. The Governor General Lord Stanley attended the 1891 Conversat. While the residences have been desegregated since 2005, the tradition remains that the Women of College their date to Saints, and the men ask their date to Conversat.

Student Publications
Trinity students publish a magazine called Salterrae (Latin, meaning The Salt of the Earth) which was founded as Trinlight in 1981. The annual yearbook is Stephanos (Greek, meaning Crown). There is also a bi-annual journal of students' short stories, photographs and poetry, called the Trinity University Review; it was first published in 1880 as Rouge et Noir (French, meaning Red and Black). In its early days, the Review published student essays, including on contentious debates at the College such as federation and the status of female students.

Dramatics
 The Trinity College Dramatic Society (TCDS) was established in 1919, and since 1921 has put on at least one full-length production each year. In recent years the TCDS has produced four shows per season, including a spring musical, selected by the College-elected TCDS committee. The TCDS used Hart House as a performance venue from 1921 until 1979, when the George Ignatieff Theatre (GIT) was constructed at Trinity. While most productions are now in the GIT, plays have also been staged in other rooms at Trinity and outside in the quadrangle, most notably the annual Shakespeare in the Quad production - a continuation of the oldest outdoor Shakespeare festival in Canada. The TCDS frequently performs student-written productions. Prior TCDS student playwrights include the Canadian film director Atom Egoyan and the journalist John Ibbitson.

Student government
At Trinity, the final student government authority is the Trinity College Meeting (TCM), a direct democracy body in which all students have equal standing (conditional on the wearing of gowns at meetings). The TCM directly governs major policy questions and the allocation of student funds, and convenes a series of committees to provide recommendations on all aspects of student life. The TCM delegates responsibility for daily affairs to six student Heads, following annual elections. There are two Heads of College, two Heads of Arts (social), two Heads of Non-Residents and one to two Head(s) of Divinity; in each case, one Head is female and one male. Students of the Faculty of Divinity additionally elect one or two Heads each year, although they do not serve as officers of the TCM.

Chapel choir

The Trinity College Chapel Choir, which grew out of the Trinity Choral Club established in the 1890s, consists of about 30 singers of mixed voice, selected by audition. Trinity College awards choral scholarships to roughly one third of the choir, tenable for private voice coaching, from an endowment of $125,000. Since the construction of the chapel in 1955, the Chapel Choir has sung an Evensong service every Wednesday night during term, in the tradition of Oxford and Cambridge choral foundations. Accompaniment is provided by the Bevan Organ Scholar, typically an undergraduate music student, who is appointed for three years and paid from a $100,000 endowment. A Director of Music conducts the choir, mentors the organ scholar, and occasionally plays the organ during services. Since 2006, the Director of Music has been Prof. John Tuttle, who is also Professor of Organ at the Faculty of Music, sometime Choirmaster and Organist at St. Thomas's Anglican Church (from 1989 to 2016), and conducted the Exultate Chamber Singers until his retirement in 2010.

Residential life

Trinity is the last undergraduate college at the University of Toronto that continues the tradition of Formal Hall during the academic year; High Table dinners are usually held after Evensong on Wednesdays. Before the meal, one of the Student Heads or another positioned member of college (in order of precedence determined by seniority) is responsible for saying the Latin grace: Quae hodie sumpturi sumus, benedicat Deus, per Iesum Christum Dominum Nostrum. Amen. (May God bless what we are about to receive this day, through Jesus Christ our Lord. Amen.) Formal Hall is marked by the enforcement of a number of regulations known as “Strachan Hall Etiquette.” The most evident of these is the dress code, of which Trinity's distinctive academic gowns are the essential element for all members of college. In addition to the wearing of the gown, men were historically required to wear a jacket, collared shirt, long pants and a tie, as well as close-toed shoes. If a member of college has had the honour of being "", they are then permitted to wear their tie tied on the remains of his gown. For women of college, the dress code consists of a similar prohibition on open-toed shoes. The dress code is not longer enforced on all students, though there still is a healthy encouragement to 'dress up' if at all possible.

The various points of etiquette are enforced by the second-year students, led by the Heads of Second Year. The Second Year students act as “deputies of the hall” and are in charge of enforcing the dress code as well as maintaining discipline during the meal. Any student in violation of the dress code will not be allowed to enter the hall until they are dressed appropriately; this regulation is relaxed for non-resident students. The second year students also have the authority to physically eject any student who causes a ruckus during the meal.

In parody of the college's Oxbridge traditions, the first year students would occasionally disrupt the formality of the meal by hurling buns at their fellow undergraduates. When this occurred, it was the job of the second years to eject all offending first years, or occasionally fellow upper years, from the hall. This was generally done with much struggle, however with little injury to any of the parties concerned. As the artillery was traditionally limited to simple bread rolls, no significant damage results from these incidents. This tradition has since fallen into abeyance, as formal dinners went from a daily to a weekly event.

Traditions and lore

Until 1993, weekday dinners at Trinity College were punctuated by the tradition of "". This tradition was a tongue-in-cheek way of imposing "discipline" on errant male members of college. The name "" relates to the "poor" behaviour of the targeted student. Under this tradition, members of second year would attempt to expel an "errant" student from the dining hall during the first 15 minutes of dinner. The targeted student would lie across the dinner table, and was usually defended by three fellow students who linked together to form a strong a defensive shell over the table and on top of the targeted student. Upon a publicly announced "call" as to the alleged transgression, the assembled members of second year would stampede from their seats to the defenders, where they were given one minute to pull the targeted student off the table. On the rare occasion that a defence did prevail for more than one minute, the defendant was permitted to leave the dining hall on his own feet. Otherwise, the head of second year (or delegate) would drag the defendant out of the hall.

In 1992 a campaign was organised against  out by a vocal minority of students who claimed victimisation. College authorities banned  out on the basis of legal liability in 1993. Rather than simply disappearing, the tradition of the  has merely evolved to suit the contemporary climate. Today,  out is an honour generally reserved for students elected to prominent positions in the college, particularly the Student Heads. Both men and women may now be ; however the actual practice is most often gender segregated. On account of the administration's aforementioned hostility to the practice, they are no longer supposed to take place on college grounds and are absolutely forbidden in Strachan Hall. Rather,  now often occur during The Lit. However, their actual form has changed little. The student selected to be  lies across a table while three of his fellow students lie across him to defend him. The assemblage is then rushed by the upper year students, who shred the gown of the person, while removing his or her defenders. Once a student has been , they wear the remains of their gown bound as a sash. The gown is never to be washed, mended or sewn and must be worn in its original state as a sign of pride for the experiences of the student whilst at Trinity.

Prior to the desegregation of residences in 2005, St. Hilda's College maintained a distinct residence life for the women of college, with its own institutions and traditions. These included an independent student government, literary institute, and dramatic society. Through till the 1950s, St. Hilda's students were required to attend services in the makeshift college chapel, as well as volunteer in the university settlement house. Other St. Hilda's-specific traditions included the wearing of halos, a reference to the nickname "Saints" given by the men of Trinity to the women of St. Hilda's. The men of Trinity often performed "Saints Serenades," which generally involved singing late at night outside the windows of St. Hilda's. Male students were strictly limited in their access to the residence for its first decades of existence. These restrictions were eventually loosened to reflect the changing moral norms of Toronto. Trinity men often found creative ways to sneak into the building after hours, or occasionally engaged in forceful panty raids, to the consternation of the administration.

Episkopon is a controversial student society at Trinity College, with a male branch founded in 1858
and a female branch founded in 1899. The society operated mostly in public, and often with official support and encouragement until it was banned from Trinity grounds by the College administration in the 1990s. Episkopon has since gone underground, and continues to operate as a pseduo-secret society.

College governance
Trinity College was incorporated under an act of the United Province of Canada in 1851, and granted the privileges of a university by a Royal Charter of Queen Victoria of July 16, 1852. The College federated with the University of Toronto under an agreement of 1903, and its present legal status as a federated university is governed under The University of Toronto Act, 1971, as amended. Governance at Trinity College operates according to the College Statutes and regulations, first consolidated in 1982 and substantially revised in 1996.

In its early years, governance at Trinity College was essentially dominated by Bishop Strachan, who held a statutory veto power over the then-unicameral College Council.

Today, the highest governing body at Trinity is the College Corporation. The Corporation presently consists of over 500 elected and statutory members, including alumni, faculty, staff, student leaders, the Anglican Bishops of Ontario, and representatives from each Diocese. Corporation meets biannually, and receives reports from the Provost and chairs of other College bodies, such as the Board of Trustees and the Senate. Corporation also formally elects the College Chancellor, Provost, Secretary, and the ceremonial Public Orator and Esquire Bedells.

The College Senate and Board of Trustee are under the authority of the corporation, and meet regularly to oversee the governing of the college. The Board of Trustees sets the College budget, approves academic appointments, sets student residence fees, recommends a candidate for Provost to Corporation, and is generally responsible for all business and affairs of the College not vested in the Senate. The Senate is primarily responsible for approving academic courses and programs to be offered by the college, as well as maintaining policies for student life, safety, and admissions.

The Council of the Faculty of Divinity is a committee of the College Senate, and is responsible for all advising on all matters relating to the Faculty of Divinity.

Chancellors and Provosts
The Chancellor is the ceremonial head of the Trinity College. They chair meetings of the corporation, and hands out degrees at the Divinity Convocation. The Chancellor is elected by Corporation for five year terms, may be re-elected without restriction, and must be a member of the Anglican Church of Canada.

The Provost is the day-to-day chief executive of the college, and serves as Vice Chancellor. The Provost serves for five year terms, and may be re-elected once. The Provost lives in College in a designated "Provost's Lodge."

Notable alumni

Trinity has graduated notable academics including theologian William Robinson Clark, Michael Ignatieff and former Trinity provost Margaret MacMillan, numerous politicians including the aforementioned Michael Ignatieff, his father George Ignatieff, former leader of the opposition and interim leader of the Liberal Party of Canada Bill Graham (Trinity's chancellor from 2007 until his death in 2022), former leader of the New Democratic Party Ed Broadbent, and former Governor General Adrienne Clarkson as well as numerous notable diplomats including former Trinity Chancellor and Canadian Ambassador to the United States Michael Wilson. Stephen Harper, Canada's 22nd Prime Minister, attended Trinity for a brief period before dropping out in his first semester.

To the field of business, Trinity has contributed Ted Rogers, president and CEO of Rogers Communications, and Jim Balsillie, former co-CEO of Research In Motion. To the arts, Trinity has contributed poets Archibald Lampman and Dorothy Livesay, architect Frank Darling, and filmmaker Atom Egoyan. Numerous high-ranking officials in the Anglican Church are also former Trinity students, including Andrew Hutchison, retired Primate of the Anglican Church of Canada. Forty-three graduates of Trinity having been awarded Rhodes Scholarships.

Trivia

 Trinity College is believed by many to be the setting of Robertson Davies’ novel The Rebel Angels. Evidence includes the similarities between Trinity and the fictional College described in the text (such as Hollier's office matching Trinty's Organmaster's office), and that a picture of Trinity's central tower (Episkopon Tower) is prominently featured on the cover of the novel's first edition.
 On April 30, 2002, Canada Post issued "University of Trinity College, 1852–2002" as part of the Canadian Universities series. The stamp was based on a design by Steven Slipp, based on photographs by James Steeves and on an illustration by Bonnie Ross. The 48¢ stamps are perforated 13.5 and were printed by Ashton-Potter Canada Limited.
 The Trinity College campus has served as the filming set for scenes in many movies and television series, including Searching for Bobby Fischer, The Skulls, Tommy Boy, Moonlight and Valentino, Class of '96, TekWar, and Ararat and also Relic Hunter.
 Since 1987, Environment Canada has hosted a climatological observation station on the Eastern edge of the Trinity grounds, between the residence houses and Philosopher's Walk
 The University of Toronto Beekeeping Education Enthusiast Society maintains two beehives on the roof of Trinity's eastern Henderson Tower

References

Further reading
Westfall, William. The Founding Moment: Church, Society, and the Construction of Trinity College. Montreal and Kingston: McGill-Queen's University Press, 2002.
Reed, T. A. A History of the University of Trinity College. Toronto: 1952.
Melville, Henry. (1852). The Rise and Progress of Trinity College, Toronto; with a Sketch of the Life of the Lord Bishop of Toronto as Connected with Church Education in Canada. Toronto: Henry Roswell.
Watson, Andrew. Trinity, 1852-1952. Toronto: Trinity Review, 1952.
Sutton, Barbara. Sanctam Hildam Canimus : A Collection of Reminiscences. Toronto: St. Hilda's College, 1988.
 Butler, David Gordon. Bishop John Strachan and Heraldry in the University of Trinity College, Toronto. Richmond Hill: Stratford Herlad Publishing Company, 2013.
 Spragge, George W. Trinity Medical College. Toronto: Ontario Historical Society, 1966.

External links

Anglican seminaries and theological colleges
Anglo-Catholic educational establishments
Educational institutions established in 1851
Seminaries and theological colleges in Canada
University of Toronto buildings
Giles Gilbert Scott church buildings
Darling and Pearson buildings
1851 establishments in Canada
Colleges of the University of Toronto